Melaghar is a small town located in the Indian state of Tripura and a Municipal Council in Sipahijala district, situated about 50 km (approx. 30 miles) from the capital Agartala. It is a neighbour to Sonamura and 10 km (6 miles) away from the Bangladesh International border. Neermahal is a famous tourist attraction in the town, situated in the middle of Rudrasagar Lake.

Geography and climate
Melaghar has a tranquil climate most of the year. However, summertime can be excessively hot, dry, humid, and interspersed with rains and thunderstorms. Winter generally starts towards the end of November and lasts until February, where the temperatures can reach very low conditions. The monsoon season starts in April, during the Bengali month of Boishakh. During the monsoon season, Melaghar is inundated frequently due to excessive rainfall and flooding by the local rivers, most memorably by the 1993 and 2007 Tripura Floods.

Demographics
Melaghar has a total population of 20,300 as of April 2017. Males constitute 51% of the population and females 49%.

Melaghar has an average literacy rate of 91%, higher than the national average of 74.04%. Male literacy is 93%, and female literacy is 88%.

The sex ratio of Melaghar is 984 females per 1000 males.
A total of 11% of the population are under 6 years of age. Whilst the majority speak Bengali, Melaghar is also home to Bengali-speaking tribes and also Hindi, as some of them are Bihari.

Location
Melaghar is located within Nalchar and Mohanbhog Block, Sonamura Subdivision, on the bank of Gomati River. Coordinates are 23.49°N 91.33°E.

Politics
Melaghar is a part of Tripura West (Lok Sabha constituency).

Education

High schools
 Human JDO English Medium High School
 Melaghar Girls Class XII School 
 Melaghar English Medium Higher Secondary School
 Melaghar Thakurpara High School 
 Ramakrishna Sishu Tirtha High School
 Rangamura Upper High School

Colleges
 Kabi Nazrul Mahavidyalaya is the nearest college, located 6.5 km far away in Sonamura area.

Sports
Cricket is the major and most played game in Melaghar. The largest field is located behind of Melaghar Class XII School, locally known as Kajal Maidan, and is being remade as a stadium.

Transport
The main transport system of Melaghar is the IRN road transport system. One part of the National Highway 8 (State Highway 6) goes through this village and was divided into two roads in Bishalgarh. Another part starts from Bishalgarh and ends at Sonamura motor stand. This is the main road of Melaghar, also known as Melaghar-Sonamura main road (SH-6). There is a small motorstand and that is developing day by day. Hundreds of people are traveling to others places from here.

Melaghar is well connected to the capital, Agartala (via Nalchar, Bishramganj and Bishalgarh) and one of the major cities Udaipur (via Kakraban and Palatana). The new bus service Sonamura-Agartala and Sonamura-Udaipur is also available. Local auto-rickshaws are available here as some go to local destinations.

Local sights and attractions

Durga Puja Festival
One of the best times to visit Melaghar is during the famous Durga Puja, when the streets come alive and people from the entire village flock to the village centre to visit the many statues of goddess Durga scattered around the village. Durga Puja is an annual Hindu festival that celebrates worship of the Hindu goddess Durga. It refers to the six days observed as Mahalaya, Shashthi, Saptami, Ashtami, Navami and Bijoya Dashami.

Melaghar is in good position in term of Maa Durga Puja for its pandals in all the state.

Kali Puja Festival
One of the main festivals is the Kali Puja, which occurs between October and November, and is where the children, adults, and the elderly attend. Melaghar is also known for its bright lights during this Puja, where the entire village is lit up.

Ratha Yatra
Melaghar RathaYatra is one of the oldest and biggest Mela (fairs) of Tripura. Every year in June–July, it (Bengali: আষাঢ়) is held at Jagannath Bari field. Thousands of people have come to increase the crowd and popularity.
 Melaghar Rath is the second-tallest in India, after Mahesh Rath (মহেশ রথযাত্রা) in West Bengal.

Shops and markets
 Anandabazar  is a grocery shopping market in  Melaghar, reopened in 2014 by former CM Manik Sarkar. It has all types of shops.
 The Infotech System and Style House are two newly opened shops here.
 The famous book shops in this village are Sikshaniketan, The Sikshaniketan etc.
 One of the famous sweet shops of Melaghar is Matri Bhandar (মাতৃভান্ডার) that everyone knows. 
 A famous Khadims shoe centre opened a shop near Hospital Road  in Melaghar.
 There are a lot of fashion shops, that people have formally known as Textiles  in Melaghar.
 Another two shopping markets' construction is recently completed; one is near Motorstand, and the second is Pal Mansion new shopping mall near Netaji Chowmuhuni.

Tourist spots and other attractions

Neermahal
Built by Maharaja Bir Bikram Kishore Debbarman (1926-1930), it is the second scenic water palace of this type, after Jal Mahal in Rajasthan, and the only one in Eastern India.

There are boat rides to travel to the main palace from Rajghat Ferryghat. Sagarmahal is a lodge hotel for tourists who wish to spend a night there. Every year hundreds of people visit for picnics in the winter time. Also many foreign birds come to the lake in the winter season.

Other attractions
 Veeramma Kali Mandir. Built by T. Veeramani Thirumeni, project manager at BBR (India) Pvt Ltd from Karaikkudi, Tamil Nadu.
 Melaghar Kali Temple
 Pagli Masi (পাগলী মাসি) Temple, attached with Kalibari. Every Bengali year, on the second day of Chaitra month (চৈত্র মাস), a local fair is held here attracting thousands of people.
 Joyramthakur Ashram
 Jagannathbari

The renovated new town hall is also one of the attractions; many types of function are held there. A swimming pool and a park, located beside the town hall, are also of interest.

Banks and ATMs
 Bandhan Bank (Bank only)
 Bank of India (Bank and ATM)
 Punjab National Bank (Bank and ATM)
 State Bank of India (Bank and ATM)
 Tripura Gramin Bank (Bank and ATM)
 Tripura State co-operative Bank
 UCO Bank (Bank and ATM)
 Ujjivan Small Finance Bank (Bank and ATM)

Local clubs and organisations
 Sanhati Club
 Red Lotus Club
 Rishi Aravinda Club
 Swami Vivekananda Sanstha
 Tarun Sangha
 Student Club
 Jagannath Club

These clubs make  in Durga or Kali Puja, hosting varieties of functions and sometimes blood donation camps.

Newspapers
 
Daily newspapers published from Agartala and Kolkata reach daily morning in this area. Daily popular papers are Dainik Sambad, Syandhan Patrika, Pratibadi Kalam, Daily Desher Katha etc. Besides above, national dailies like The Telegraph, Anandabazar Patrika, Bartaman, The Times of India or The Statesman, are also available. All the collections can be found at Melaghar Public Library.

Telecommunications
The important and major mobile-phone network such as Airtel, BSNL, Jio, Vi and only BSNL broadband services are available here.

Nearby cities
Some nearby major towns' distances from Melaghar:

Note: All distances are measured by road (shortest).

See also
 List of cities and towns in Tripura
 Tripura

References

Cities and towns in Sipahijala district